Dominique Lavanant (born 24 May 1944) is a César Award-winning French film and theatrical actress. She is known for her comedy skills especially with posh and distinguished characters like Rosalind Russell's; characters often defined by the adjective BCBG, bon chic bon genre, and which refers to a particular stereotype of the French upper middle class – to be conservative in both outlook and dress.

Career
Dominique Lavanant achieved fame in the mid-1970s while filming Les bronzés with the acting troupe Le Splendid - (Gérard Jugnot, Josiane Balasko, Michel Blanc, Thierry Lhermitte, Christian Clavier, Marie-Anne Chazel). Her stardom has kept growing ever since.

Her filmography includes many successful films: Papy fait de la résistance, La boum, Trois hommes et un couffin, Les bronzés font du ski, Inspecteur la Bavure (alongside Gérard Depardieu).

In 1988, she was awarded Best supporting actress for her role in Agent trouble (with Catherine Deneuve).

She also starred in the long-lasting French TV series Sœur Thérèse.com (2002-2011) playing a former policer who became a nun but is still a committed detective.

Filmography

References

External links
 

1944 births
Living people
People from Morlaix
French film actresses
Best Supporting Actress César Award winners
French stage actresses
20th-century French actresses
21st-century French actresses
French television actresses
French women screenwriters
French screenwriters